Montebelluna is a city and comune in Veneto, Italy, approximately  northwest of Venice. It has an estimated population of 32,000. 

Montebelluna borders the following municipalities: Altivole, Caerano di San Marco, Cornuda, Crocetta del Montello, Trevignano, Vedelago, Volpago del Montello.

Physical geography

Territory
The territory of Montebelluna is largely flat, with altitudes ranging from 69 m a.s.l., found south of San Gaetano, to 144 m, north of Pederiva. The landscape is also characterized by the presence of two hills, including the western end of Montello (where the maximum altitude is, 343 m) and the more modest Capo di Monte (or Montebelluna Alta, or even the hill of Mercato Vecchio, 199 m). Between the two reliefs passes a natural corridor (along which the Feltrina passes), once the original bed of the Piave.

The area is naturally poor in waterways but the water supply has been ensured, since ancient times, by a system of artificial canals deriving from the Piave. These are in particular the Canale del Bosco and the Canale di Caerano, branches of the Brentella di Pederobba.

Climate
The climate has hot and sultry summers due to high humidity levels, often with strong thunderstorms and possible steps. On the basis of the reference average (1961-1990), the temperature goes from the minimum value of about 0 ° C in January-February to the maximum value of 29 ° C in July-August. The average temperature of the coldest month, January, is +3.1 ° C, that of the hottest month, July, is +23.0 ° C Occasionally snowfalls may occur but of little entity.

Origins of the name
The toponym is clearly a compound. Monte- would indicate the hill of Mercato Vecchio, at the foot of which the town was built.
The origin of -belluna is more discussed: it could be in relation to the cult of the goddess Bellona; or, postponing its origin, it would refer to the city of Belluno which, in the 10th century, had expanded its jurisdiction beyond the Piave thanks to the conquests of Bishop Giovanni.
The first evidence of the toponym is in the year 1000 << de Musano usque in capite montis Belluni >>, in 1239 << Montis Bellunensis Castrum >>, in 1245 << Castrum Montisbellune >> and in 1251 <<Montebelluna>>.

Ancient history
Protohistoric and Roman age
The first traces of human activity date back to the Stone and Bronze Ages (Middle Paleolithic). The birth of a real settlement, however, occurs around the ninth century BC. Its development was favored by the strategic geographical position at the mouth of the Piave valley, connection between the plain and the pre-Alpine area. Over time it will become the most important center of pre-Roman Veneto. This information is given to us by the numerous findings of cemetery areas in the localities of Santa Maria in Colle and Posmon. The area continues to be inhabited during the Roman period (from the Romanization of the Veneto between the 2nd-1st century BC until the 2nd century AD). Montebelluna will become part of the centuriation of the Roman municipality Acelum (Asolo). It is not yet ascertained as a hypothesis, much less that Montebelluna was a residential center (near Santa Maria in Colle) or a Roman castra in defense of the Asolo and Treviso fences.

Economy 
Montebelluna is one of the largest industrial center in synergy with the nearby province of Vicenza. The industries are specialized above all in the tanning, metalworking, electrotechnical, optical, food, footwear, clothing (especially sports), precision instruments, plastics and graphic arts sectors. The agricultural sector is active in the production of vegetables, fruit, wine grapes, cereals, fodder and in the practice of cattle breeding. Trade and logistics developed, favored by the strategic position of the town, a road junction at the center of an important production area.
It is a major producer of ski boots. In 1989, it manufactured over 70% of the global output. Outside magazine has characterized it as "The world's leading design center for outdoor footwear." More than a dozen boot and sport shoe brands, including Alpina Žiri, Asolo, Fila, La Sportiva, Lowa, Mammut Sports Group, Scarpa, and Tecnica Group, do at least some of their work in the city. A museum of bootmaking, the Museo dello Scarpone e della Calzatura Sportiva, is housed in the Villa Zuccareda Binetti.

2022 marks an important date for Montebellluna when exactly 150 years ago was transferred the old market from the Colle to the plain took place, an event that also led to the birth of the city as we know it today.
To celebrate this special anniversary, the municipal administration of Montebelluna, also on input from the Promoting Committee and assisted by the Steering Committee and the Operational Committee, has prepared a rich calendar that consists of initiatives, manifestations and events of various kinds that will last all year round. with the involvement of many local associations as well as the civil community.

To create the logo and the payoff, the students of the Technologies and techniques of graphic representation of the Einaudi Scarpa Institute in Monbelluna were involved and took part in an ideas competition to create the logo and the payoff. The various proposals formulated were evaluated by the Montebelluna 150 working group which chose the logo and the payoff created by a female student of 4^A GRC  who impressed for elegance, value and trait.

Culture

Education

In the municipality there are numerous preschool, primary and lower secondary schools. The secondary schools of a certain importance for the city are the Primo Levi Higher Education Institute (former high school and scientific high school), the state high school "Angela Veronese" with the three addresses that characterize it linguistic, economic and social-art, the Einaudi-Scarpa Higher Education Institute, which houses the technological, economic and professional courses. Agricultural Institute of Castelfranco Veneto (I.S.I.S.S." D. Sartor ") since the nineties has also managed the detached school in the San Gaetano district.

Cultural institutions
 Municipal Library of Montebelluna
 Natural History and Archeology Museum, in Villa Biagi
 "Roberto Binotto" Theater, in Villa Correr Pisani in Biadene
 MEVE - Veneto Memorial of the Great War, in Villa Correr Pisani
 Boot and sports shoe museum, in Villa Zuccareda Binetti

Infrastructure and transport

Roads 
Situated along the Schiavonesca-Marosticana state road 248, Montebelluna also represents an important stop on the so-called via Feltrina, current provincial road 2. The city is served by the toll booth of the same name on the Pedemontana Veneta superstrada, which opened to traffic on 28 May 2021.

Between 1913 and 1931 the city center and the aforementioned road routes saw the presence of the tracks of the Montebelluna-Asolo and Montebelluna-Valdobbiadene tramways, managed by the Società Veneta, which at the time represented an important development tool for the economy of the area.

The people of Montebelluna had been waiting for it for 50 years and on February 18, 2023, after the delay due to the particular international economic situation, the long-awaited railway underpass of via Piave was opened.

Urban mobility 
The urban and extra-urban bus services are carried out by the company Mobilità di Marca. The municipal area is served by 4 urban lines. Montebelluna has a bus station from which the MOM lines branch off towards Treviso, the other municipalities of the Treviso area and also extended towards other locations outside the Province of Treviso.

Railways 
The Montebelluna station, fully electrified since December 2020, is served by regional services carried out by Trenitalia as part of the service contract stipulated with the Veneto Region, once common to the tramways, located on the Calalzo-Padua line, and is the origin of the Treviso line.

Until 1966, the Montebelluna-Susegana railway also branched off from the same station, built in 1916 for military purposes.

With the update of the Rfi-Mit program contract of 24 July 2019, the missing funds were allocated for the electrification of the entire line up to Belluno, thus completing the last piece of the lower Belluno ring.

A first continuous interruption occurred for the stretch of the Montebelluna-Feltre railway line, to allow for another phase of electrification works on the stretch up to Belluno which ended on 11 June 2022. Until 25 February next, all lines in service of the Marca Trevigiana and the province of Belluno will be open and active as normal and starting from 26 February the Montebelluna - Feltre section will close again, still affected by electrification works until 10 June 2023.

Notable people
Alberto Bottari de Castello, archbishop
Aldo Serena, football player
Attilio Tesser, football player
Luca Badoer, F1 driver
Marcello Agnoletto, football player
Oscar Gatto, cyclist
Luigi Datome, basketball player
Federico Furlan, football player
Angela Veronese (1778-1847), poet
Patrizio Billio, football player
 Brando Badoer, racing driver and son of Luca

Sister cities

 Dammarie-les-Lys, France, since 1987
 Oberkochen, Germany, since 1992
 Tata, Hungary, since 2000

See also

 Calcio Montebelluna

References

External links 

 

Cities and towns in Veneto